Mere Green is a hamlet in the English county of Worcestershire.

It is located south of the village of Hanbury roughly midway between Worcester and Redditch.

External links 

Hamlets in Worcestershire